Bayan Muna is a party-list in the Philippines, a member of the leftist political coalition Makabayan. The motto of the party is "New Politics, the Politics of Change", against "traditional, elitist, pro-imperialist politics". Its platform includes the advocation of a government that progressively supports the working class, with meaningful representation of all democratic sectors in the Philippines. Bayan Muna was the second most popular party-list party in the 2007 Philippine elections. In 2009, Bayan Muna Representative Satur Ocampo and former Bayan Muna and incumbent Gabriela Representative Liza Maza ran for senate seats as guest candidates under the ticket of billionaire real estate magnate Senator Manny Villar. Ocampo said that their common objective “is to emancipate the people from widespread poverty and social injustice."

Electoral performance

2007 elections
In the weeks leading up the Philippine national election, Executive Secretary Eduardo Ermita, on behalf of the Armed Forces of the Philippines, admitted "Malacañang’s leading role in the fabricated charges leveled against Rep. Ocampo and the campaign to crush Bayan Muna." Bayan Muna partylist representative Satur Ocampo was detained weeks prior in March 2007 on murder charges from an alleged 1984 communist purge in Leyte. The arrest was widely condemned by international observers. Rep. Ocampo was ordered released on bail by the Supreme Court. In the May 14, 2007 election, the party won 2 seats in the nationwide party-list vote.

References

External links
Bayan Muna (Archived version)

Left-wing parties in the Philippines
National Democracy Movement (Philippines)
Party-lists represented in the House of Representatives of the Philippines
Political parties established in 1999
1999 establishments in the Philippines